The 2009 Houston Dynamo season was the fourth season of existence for the Houston franchise since joining Major League Soccer (MLS) prior to the 2006 season. It was the team's fourth season with head coach Dominic Kinnear, majority owner Philip Anschultz, president Oliver Luck, and chief operating officer Chris Canetti.

The Dynamo qualified for the MLS Cup Playoffs for the fourth consecutive year after finishing 2nd in the Western Conference during the regular season.  In the playoffs, Houston defeated the Seattle Sounders FC 1–0 over two legs in the Conference Semifinals before losing 2–0 to the Los Angeles Galaxy in the Conference Final. In the U.S. Open Cup, the Dynamo reached the semifinals, where they lost 2–1 to the eventual champion Seattle Sounders.  The Dynamo also competed in the CONCACAF Champions League, losing to Atlante 4–1 on aggregate in the quarterfinals of the 2008–09 Champions League while also finishing third in their group for the 2009–10 Champions League, failing to advance.

Final roster
As of November 14, 2009.

Appearances and goals are totals for MLS regular season only.

Player movement

In
Per Major League Soccer and club policies terms of the deals do not get disclosed.

Out
Per Major League Soccer and club policies terms of the deals do not get disclosed.

Loans in

Loans out

MLS SuperDraft

Coaching staff
As of November 14, 2009.

Pre-season

Friendlies

Competitions

Major League Soccer

Standings

Western Conference

Overall

Results summary

Results by round

Match results

MLS Cup Playoffs

U.S. Open Cup

2008–09 CONCACAF Champions League

2009–10 CONCACAF Champions League

Player statistics

Appearances, goals, and assists 
{| class="wikitable sortable" style="text-align:center;"
|+
! rowspan="2" |
! rowspan="2" |
! rowspan="2" |
! rowspan="2" |
! colspan="3" |
! colspan="3" |
! colspan="3" |
! colspan="3" |
! colspan="3" |
! colspan="3" |
|-
!!!!!!!!!!!!!!!!!!!!!!!!!!!!!!!!!!!
|-
|1||GK||||align=left|||7||1||0||0||0||0||0||0||0||3||0||0||0||0||0||4||1||0
|-
|2||DF||||align=left|||5||1||0||1||0||0||1||0||0||0||0||0||0||0||0||3||1||0
|-
|3||DF||||align=left|||13||0||0||8||0||0||0||0||0||3||0||0||2||0||0||0||0||0
|-
|4||DF||||align=left|||9||0||2||6||0||2||0||0||0||0||0||0||0||0||0||3||0||0
|-
|5||MF||||align=left|||11||0||0||6||0||0||0||0||0||3||0||0||0||0||0||2||0||0
|-
|6||MF||||align=left|||8||0||0||2||0||0||0||0||0||3||0||0||0||0||0||3||0||0
|-
|7||FW||||align=left|||10||1||0||7||1||0||3||0||0||0||0||0||0||0||0||0||0||0
|-
|7||FW||||align=left|||8||2||1||7||2||1||0||0||0||0||0||0||1||0||0||0||0||0
|-
|8||MF||||align=left|||17||1||1||14||1||1||0||0||0||1||0||0||2||0||0||0||0||0
|-
|9||MF||||align=left|||38||0||6||25||0||4||3||0||0||3||0||1||2||0||0||5||0||1
|-
|10||FW||||align=left|||3||1||1||1||1||0||0||0||0||0||0||0||0||0||0||2||0||1
|-
|10||FW||||align=left|||28||6||1||22||5||1||0||0||0||3||0||0||2||0||0||1||1||0
|-
|11||MF||||align=left|||39||5||13||27||5||12||3||0||0||2||0||0||2||0||1||5||0||0
|-
|13||MF||||align=left|||29||1||1||22||1||1||3||0||0||0||0||0||2||0||0||2||0||0
|-
|14||FW||||align=left|||18||1||0||14||0||0||0||0||0||3||1||0||0||0||0||1||0||0
|-
|15||FW||||align=left|||13||4||1||8||3||1||2||0||0||0||0||0||0||0||0||3||1||0
|-
|16||DF||||align=left|||18||1||0||13||1||0||0||0||0||0||0||0||1||0||0||4||0||0
|-
|17||MF||||align=left|||24||0||3||15||0||3||2||0||0||3||0||0||0||0||0||4||0||0
|-
|18||GK||||align=left|||37||0||0||30||0||0||3||0||0||0||0||0||2||0||0||2||0||0
|-
|19||MF||||align=left|||6||0||2||0||0||0||0||0||0||3||0||2||0||0||0||3||0||0
|-
|20||MF||||align=left|||41||5||6||29||2||6||3||0||0||2||2||0||2||0||0||5||1||0
|-
|22||MF||||align=left|||36||8||5||26||6||4||3||0||0||0||0||0||2||0||0||5||2||1
|-
|23||FW||||align=left|||27||3||4||16||1||4||3||0||0||3||2||0||0||0||0||5||0||0
|-
|24||DF||||align=left|||19||0||0||12||0||0||1||0||0||0||0||0||2||0||0||4||0||0
|-
|25||FW||||align=left|||29||10||4||19||8||3||3||1||0||0||0||0||2||0||0||5||1||1
|-
|26||MF||||align=left|||37||2||5||27||0||3||2||0||0||3||1||1||1||0||0||4||1||1
|-
|30||GK||||align=left|||0||0||0||0||0||0||0||0||0||0||0||0||0||0||0||0||0||0
|-
|31||DF||||align=left|||28||1||2||20||1||2||3||0||0||1||0||0||0||0||0||4||0||0
|-
|32||DF||||align=left|||41||3||0||29||1||0||3||0||0||3||1||0||1||1||0||5||0||0

Disciplinary record 
{| class="wikitable sortable" style="text-align:center;"
|+
!width=15 rowspan="2" |
!width=15 rowspan="2" |
!width=15 rowspan="2" |
!width=100 rowspan="2" |Player
! colspan="2" |Total
! colspan="2" |MLS
! colspan="2" |Playoffs
! colspan="2" |U.S. Open Cup
!width=60 colspan="2" |2008–09 Champions League
!width=60 colspan="2" |2009–10 Champions League
|-
!style="width:30px;"|!!style="width:30px;"|!!style="width:30px;"|!!style="width:30px;"|!!style="width:30px;"|!!style="width:30px;"|!!style="width:30px;"|!!style="width:30px;"|!!style="width:30px;"|!!style="width:30px;"|!!style="width:30px;"|!!style="width:30px;"|
|-
|2||DF||||align=left|||1||0||1||0||0||0||0||0||0||0||0||0
|-
|3||DF||||align=left|||5||0||3||0||0||0||1||0||1||0||0||0
|-
|4||DF||||align=left|||2||0||1||0||0||0||0||0||0||0||1||0
|-
|5||MF||||align=left|||1||0||0||0||0||0||0||0||0||0||1||0
|-
|6||MF||||align=left|||1||0||0||0||0||0||1||0||0||0||0||0
|-
|7||FW||||align=left|||2||0||1||0||1||0||0||0||0||0||0||0
|-
|7||FW||||align=left|||1||0||1||0||0||0||0||0||0||0||0||0
|-
|8||MF||||align=left|||3||0||1||0||0||0||0||0||2||0||0||0
|-
|9||MF||||align=left|||7||0||2||0||2||0||1||0||0||0||2||0
|-
|10||FW||||align=left|||5||0||3||0||0||0||0||0||2||0||0||0
|-
|11||MF||||align=left|||7||2||4||2||0||0||1||0||1||0||1||0
|-
|13||MF||||align=left|||4||1||4||1||0||0||0||0||0||0||0||0
|-
|14||FW||||align=left|||1||0||1||0||0||0||0||0||0||0||0||0
|-
|15||FW||||align=left|||1||1||0||1||0||0||0||0||0||0||1||0
|-
|16||DF||||align=left|||4||0||2||0||0||0||0||0||0||0||2||0
|-
|17||MF||||align=left|||7||1||4||1||2||0||1||0||0||0||0||0
|-
|18||GK||||align=left|||2||0||1||0||1||0||0||0||0||0||0||0
|-
|20||MF||||align=left|||10||0||6||0||1||0||0||0||1||0||2||0
|-
|22||MF||||align=left|||4||0||1||0||0||0||0||0||0||0||3||0
|-
|23||FW||||align=left|||3||0||1||0||0||0||0||0||0||0||2||0
|-
|24||DF||||align=left|||3||0||3||0||0||0||0||0||0||0||0||0
|-
|25||FW||||align=left|||4||2||4||2||0||0||0||0||0||0||0||0
|-
|26||MF||||align=left|||2||1||1||0||0||0||0||0||0||0||1||1
|-
|31||DF||||align=left|||5||1||3||1||0||0||0||0||0||0||2||0
|-
|32||DF||||align=left|||10||0||7||0||1||0||1||0||0||0||1||0

Clean sheets 
{| class="wikitable" style="text-align:center;"
|+
!Rank!!Nat.!!Player!!width=60|MLS!!width=60|Playoffs!!width=60|U.S. Open Cup!!width=60|2008–09 Champions League!!width=60|2009–10 Champions League!!width=60|Total
|-
|1||||Pat Onstad||10||2||0||0||1
!13
|-
|2||||Tally Hall||0||0||2||0||0
!2
|-
! colspan="3" |Total!!10!!2!!2!!0!!1!!15

Honors and awards

MLS Player of the Week

MLS Goal of the Week

MLS Save of the Week

Annual

Dynamo team awards

Kits 
Supplier: Adidas / Sponsor: Amigo Energy

References

External links 
2009 Schedule

2009
Houston Dynamo
Houston Dynamo
Houston Dynamo